Citizen science (similar to community science, crowd science, crowd-sourced science, civic science, participatory monitoring, or volunteer monitoring) is scientific research conducted with participation from the public (who are sometimes referred to as amateur/nonprofessional scientists). There are variations in the exact definition of citizen science, with different individuals and organizations having their own specific interpretations of what citizen science encompasses.  Citizen science is used in a wide range of areas of study, with most citizen science research publications being in the fields of biology and conservation. There are different applications and functions of citizen science in research projects.  Citizen science can be used as a methodology where public volunteers help in collecting and classifying data, improving the scientific community's capacity.  Citizen science can also involve more direct involvement from the public, with communities initiating projects researching environment and health hazards in their own communities. Participation in citizen science projects also educates the public about the scientific process and increases awareness about different topics.  Some schools have students participate in citizen science projects for this purpose as a part of the teaching curriculums.

The first use of the term "citizen science" can be found in a January 1989 issue of MIT Technology Review, which featured three community-based labs studying environmental issues. In the 21st century, the number of citizen science projects, publications, and funding opportunities has increased. Citizen science has been used more over time, a trend helped by technological advancements.  Digital citizen science platforms, such as Zooniverse, store large amounts of data for many projects and are a place where volunteers can learn how to contribute to projects. For some projects, participants are instructed to collect and enter data, such as what species they observed, into large digital global databases.  For other projects, participants help classify data on digital platforms. Citizen science data is also being used to develop machine learning algorithms.  An example is using volunteer-classified images to train machine learning algorithms to identify species. While global participation and global databases are found on online platforms,  not all locations always have the same amount of data from contributors.  Concerns over potential data quality issues, such as measurement errors and biases, in citizen science projects are recognized in the scientific community and there are statistical solutions and best practices available which can help.

Definition 
The term "citizen science" has multiple origins, as well as differing concepts. It was first defined independently in the mid-1990s by Rick Bonney in the United States and Alan Irwin in the United Kingdom. Alan Irwin, a British sociologist, defines citizen science as "developing concepts of scientific citizenship which foregrounds the necessity of opening up science and science policy processes to the public". Irwin sought to reclaim two dimensions of the relationship between citizens and science: 1) that science should be responsive to citizens' concerns and needs; and 2) that citizens themselves could produce reliable scientific knowledge. The American ornithologist Rick Bonney, unaware of Irwin's work, defined citizen science as projects in which nonscientists, such as amateur birdwatchers, voluntarily contributed scientific data. This describes a more limited role for citizens in scientific research than Irwin's conception of the term.

The terms citizen science and citizen scientists entered the Oxford English Dictionary (OED) in June 2014. "Citizen science" is defined as "scientific work undertaken by members of the general public, often in collaboration with or under the direction of professional scientists and scientific institutions". "Citizen scientist" is defined as: (a) "a scientist whose work is characterized by a sense of responsibility to serve the best interests of the wider community (now rare)"; or (b) "a member of the general public who engages in scientific work, often in collaboration with or under the direction of professional scientists and scientific institutions; an amateur scientist". The first use of the term "citizen scientist" can be found in the magazine New Scientist in an article about ufology from October 1979.

Muki Haklay cites, from a policy report for the Wilson Center entitled "Citizen Science and Policy: A European Perspective", an alternate first use of the term "citizen science" by R. Kerson in the magazine MIT Technology Review from January 1989. Quoting from the Wilson Center report: "The new form of engagement in science received the name 'citizen science'. The first recorded example of the use of the term is from 1989, describing how 225 volunteers across the US collected rain samples to assist the Audubon Society in an acid-rain awareness raising campaign."A "Green Paper on Citizen Science" was published in 2013 by the European Commission's Digital Science Unit and Socientize.eu, which included a definition for citizen science, referring to "the general public engagement in scientific research activities when citizens actively contribute to science either with their intellectual effort or surrounding knowledge or with their tools and resources. Participants provide experimental data and facilities for researchers, raise new questions and co-create a new scientific culture."

Citizen science may be performed by individuals, teams, or networks of volunteers. Citizen scientists often partner with professional scientists to achieve common goals. Large volunteer networks often allow scientists to accomplish tasks that would be too expensive or time-consuming to accomplish through other means.

Many citizen-science projects serve education and outreach goals. These projects may be designed for a formal classroom environment or an informal education environment such as museums.

Citizen science has evolved over the past four decades. Recent projects place more emphasis on scientifically sound practices and measurable goals for public education. Modern citizen science differs from its historical forms primarily in the access for, and subsequent scale of, public participation; technology is credited as one of the main drivers of the recent explosion of citizen science activity.

In March 2015, the Office of Science and Technology Policy published a factsheet entitled "Empowering Students and Others through Citizen Science and Crowdsourcing". Quoting: "Citizen science and crowdsourcing projects are powerful tools for providing students with skills needed to excel in science, technology, engineering, and math (STEM). Volunteers in citizen science, for example, gain hands-on experience doing real science, and in many cases take that learning outside of the traditional classroom setting". The National Academies of Science cites SciStarter as a platform offering access to more than 2,700 citizen science projects and events, as well as helping interested parties access tools that facilitate project participation.

In May 2016, a new open-access journal was started by the Citizen Science Association along with Ubiquity Press called Citizen Science: Theory and Practice (CS:T&P). Quoting from the editorial article titled "The Theory and Practice of Citizen Science: Launching a New Journal", "CS:T&P provides the space to enhance the quality and impact of citizen science efforts by deeply exploring the citizen science concept in all its forms and across disciplines. By examining, critiquing, and sharing findings across a variety of citizen science endeavors, we can dig into the underpinnings and assumptions of citizen science and critically analyze its practice and outcomes."

In February 2020, Timber Press, an imprint of Workman Publishing Company, published The Field Guide to Citizen Science as a practical guide for anyone interested in getting started with citizen science.

Alternative definitions
Other definitions for citizen science have also been proposed. For example, Bruce Lewenstein of Cornell University's Communication and S&TS departments describes three possible definitions:
 The participation of nonscientists in the process of gathering data according to specific scientific protocols and in the process of using and interpreting that data.
 The engagement of nonscientists in true decision-making about policy issues that have technical or scientific components.
 The engagement of research scientists in the democratic and policy process.

Scientists and scholars who have used other definitions include Frank N. von Hippel, Stephen Schneider, Neal Lane and Jon Beckwith. Other alternative terminologies proposed are "civic science" and "civic scientist".

Further, Muki Haklay offers an overview of the typologies of the level of citizen participation in citizen science, which range from "crowdsourcing" (level 1), where the citizen acts as a sensor, to "distributed intelligence" (level 2), where the citizen acts as a basic interpreter, to "participatory science", where citizens contribute to problem definition and data collection (level 3), to "extreme citizen science", which involves collaboration between the citizen and scientists in problem definition, collection and data analysis.

A 2014 Mashable article defines a citizen scientist as: "Anybody who voluntarily contributes his or her time and resources toward scientific research in partnership with professional scientists."

In 2016 the Australian Citizen Science Association released their definition which states "Citizen science involves public participation and collaboration in scientific research with the aim to increase scientific knowledge."

Related fields
In a Smart City era, Citizen Science relays on various web-based tools, such as WebGIS, and becomes Cyber Citizen Science. Some projects, such as SETI@home, use the Internet to take advantage of distributed computing. These projects are generally passive. Computation tasks are performed by volunteers' computers and require little involvement beyond initial setup. There is disagreement as to whether these projects should be classified as citizen science.

The astrophysicist and Galaxy Zoo co-founder Kevin Schawinski stated: "We prefer to call this [Galaxy Zoo] citizen science because it's a better description of what you're doing; you're a regular citizen but you're doing science. Crowd sourcing sounds a bit like, well, you're just a member of the crowd and you're not; you're our collaborator. You're pro-actively involved in the process of science by participating."

Compared to SETI@home, "Galaxy Zoo volunteers do real work. They're not just passively running something on their computer and hoping that they'll be the first person to find aliens. They have a stake in science that comes out of it, which means that they are now interested in what we do with it, and what we find."

Citizen policy may be another result of citizen science initiatives. Bethany Brookshire (pen name SciCurious) writes: "If citizens are going to live with the benefits or potential consequences of science (as the vast majority of them will), it's incredibly important to make sure that they are not only well informed about changes and advances in science and technology, but that they also ... are able to ... influence the science policy decisions that could impact their lives." In "The Rightful Place of Science: Citizen Science", editors Darlene Cavalier and Eric Kennedy highlight emerging connections between citizen science, civic science, and participatory technology assessment.

Benefits and limitations
Citizen involvement in scientific projects has become a means of encouraging curiosity and greater understanding of science whilst providing an unprecedented engagement between professional scientists and the general public. In a research report published by the National Park Service in 2008, Brett Amy Thelen and Rachel K. Thiet mention the following concerns, previously reported in the literature, about the validity of volunteer-generated data:
 Some projects may not be suitable for volunteers, for instance, when they use complex research methods or require a lot of (often repetitive) work.
 If volunteers lack proper training in research and monitoring protocols, they are at risk of introducing bias into the data.

The question of data accuracy, in particular, remains open. John Losey, who created the Lost Ladybug citizen science project, has argued that the cost-effectiveness of citizen science data can outweigh data quality issues, if properly managed.

In December 2016, authors M. Kosmala, A. Wiggins, A. Swanson and B. Simmons published a study in the journal Frontiers in Ecology and the Environment called "Assessing Data Quality in Citizen Science". The abstract describes how ecological and environmental citizen science projects have enormous potential to advance science. Also, citizen science projects can influence policy and guide resource management by producing datasets that are otherwise infeasible to generate. In the section "In a Nutshell" (pg3), four condensed conclusions are stated. They are:

They conclude that as citizen science continues to grow and mature, a key metric of project success they expect to see will be a growing awareness of data quality. They also conclude that citizen science will emerge as a general tool helping "to collect otherwise unobtainable high-quality data in support of policy and resource management, conservation monitoring, and basic science."

A study of Canadian lepidoptera datasets published in 2018 compared the use of a professionally curated dataset of butterfly specimen records with four years of data from a citizen science program, eButterfly. The eButterfly dataset was used as it was determined to be of high quality because of the expert vetting process used on the site, and there existed a historic dataset covering the same geographic area consisting of specimen data, much of it institutional. The authors note that, in this case, citizen science data provides both novel and complementary information to the specimen data. Five new species were reported from the citizen science data, and geographic distribution information was improved for over 80% of species in the combined dataset when citizen science data was included.

Several recent studies have begun to explore the accuracy of citizen science projects and how to predict accuracy based on variables like expertise of practitioners. One example is a 2021 study by Edgar Santos-Fernandez and Kerrie Mengersen of the British Ecological Society who utilized a case study which used recent R and Stan programming software to offer ratings of the accuracy of species identifications performed by citizen scientists in Serengeti National Park, Tanzania. This provided insight into possible problems with processes like this which include, "discriminatory power and guessing behaviour". The researchers determined that methods for rating the citizen scientists themselves based on skill level and expertise might make studies they conduct more easy to analyze.

Studies that are simple in execution are where citizen science excels in, particularly in the field of conservation biology and ecology. For example, in 2019, Sumner et al. compared the data of vespid wasp distributions collected by citizen scientists with the 4-decade, long-term dataset established by the BWARS. They set up the Big Wasp Survey from 26 August to 10 September 2017, inviting citizen scientists to trap wasps and send them for identification by experts where data was recorded. The results of this study showed that the campaign garnered over 2000 citizen scientists helping out with data collection, identifying over 6600 wasps. This experiment provides strong evidence that citizen science can generate potentially high-quality data comparable to that of expert data collection, within a shorter time frame. Although, the experiment was to originally test the strength of citizen science, the team also learned more about Vespidae biology and species distribution in the United Kingdom. With this study, the simple procedure enables citizen science to be executed in a successful manner. A study by J. Cohn describes that volunteers can be trained to use equipment and process data, especially considering that a large proportion of citizen scientists are individuals who are already well-versed in the field of science. The primary composition of volunteers in a citizen science project are students and educators in the science department. Other groups of volunteers include conservationists, outdoor enthusiasts, and amateur scientists. As such, citizen scientists are generally composed of individuals with a pre-understanding of the scientific method and how to conduct sensible and just scientific analysis.

Ethics

Various studies have been published that explore the ethics of citizen science, including issues such as intellectual property and project design.(e.g.) The Citizen Science Association (CSA), based at the Cornell Lab of Ornithology, and the European Citizen Science Association (ECSA), based in the Museum für Naturkunde in Berlin, have working groups on ethics and principles.

In September 2015, ECSA published its Ten Principles of Citizen Science, which have been developed by the "Sharing best practice and building capacity" working group of ECSA, led by the Natural History Museum, London with input from many members of the association.

The medical ethics of internet crowdsourcing has been questioned by Graber & Graber in the Journal of Medical Ethics. In particular, they analyse the effect of games and the crowdsourcing project Foldit. They conclude: "games can have possible adverse effects, and that they manipulate the user into participation".

In March 2019 the online journal Citizen Science: Theory and Practice launched a collection of articles on the theme of Ethical Issues in Citizen Science. The articles are introduced with (quoting): "Citizen science can challenge existing ethical norms because it falls outside of customary methods of ensuring that research is conducted ethically. What ethical issues arise when engaging the public in research? How have these issues been addressed, and how should they be addressed in the future?"

In June 2019, East Asian Science, Technology and Society: An International Journal (EASTS) published an issue titled "Citizen Science: Practices and Problems" which contains 15 articles/studies on citizen science, including many relevant subjects of which ethics is one. Quoting from the introduction "Citizen, Science, and Citizen Science": "The term citizen science has become very popular among scholars as well as the general public, and, given its growing presence in East Asia, it is perhaps not a moment too soon to have a special issue of EASTS on the topic."

Use of citizen science volunteers as de facto unpaid laborers by some commercial ventures have been criticized as exploitative.

Ethics in citizen science in the health and welfare field, has been discussed in terms of protection versus participation. Public involvement researcher Kristin Liabo writes that health researcher might, in light of their ethics training, be inclined to exclude vulnerable individuals from participation, to protect them from harm. However, she argues these groups are already likely to be excluded from participation in other arenas, and that participation can be empowering and a possibility to gain life skills that these individuals need. Whether or not to become involved should be a decision these individuals should be involved in and not a researcher decision.

Economic worth

In the research paper "Can citizen science enhance public understanding of science?" by Bonney et al. 2016, statistics which analyse the economic worth of citizen science are used, drawn from two papers: i) Sauermann and Franzoni 2015, and
ii)Theobald et al. 2015. In "Crowd science user contribution patterns and their implications" by Sauermann and Franzoni (2015), seven projects from the Zooniverse web portal are used to estimate the monetary value of the citizen science that had taken place. The seven projects are: Solar Stormwatch, Galaxy Zoo Supernovae, Galaxy Zoo Hubble, Moon Zoo, Old Weather, The Milky Way Project and Planet Hunters. Using data from 180 days in 2010, they find a total of 100,386 users participated, contributing 129,540 hours of unpaid work. Estimating at a rate of $12 an hour (an undergraduate research assistant's basic wage), the total contributions amount to $1,554,474, an average of $222,068 per project. The range over the seven projects was from $22,717 to $654,130.

In "Global change and local solutions: Tapping the unrealized potential of citizen science for biodiversity research" by Theobald et al. 2015, the authors surveyed 388 unique biodiversity-based projects. Quoting: "We estimate that between 1.36 million and 2.28 million people volunteer annually in the 388 projects we surveyed, though variation is great" and that "the range of in-kind contribution of the volunteerism in our 388 citizen science projects as between $667 million to $2.5 billion annually."

Worldwide participation in citizen science continues to grow. A list of the top five citizen science communities compiled by Marc Kuchner and Kristen Erickson in July 2018 shows a total of 3.75 million participants, although there is likely substantial overlap between the communities.

Relations with education and academia

There have been studies published which examine the place of citizen science within education.(e.g.) Teaching aids can include books and activity or lesson plans.(e.g.). Some examples of studies are:

From the Second International Handbook of Science Education, a chapter entitled: "Citizen Science, Ecojustice, and Science Education: Rethinking an Education from Nowhere", by Mueller and Tippins (2011), acknowledges in the abstract that: "There is an emerging emphasis in science education on engaging youth in citizen science." The authors also ask: "whether citizen science goes further with respect to citizen development." The abstract ends by stating that the "chapter takes account of the ways educators will collaborate with members of the community to effectively guide decisions, which offers promise for sharing a responsibility for democratizing science with others."

From the journal Democracy and Education, an article entitled: "Lessons Learned from Citizen Science in the Classroom" by authors Gray, Nicosia and Jordan (GNJ) (2012) gives a response to a study by Mueller, Tippins and Bryan (MTB) called "The Future of Citizen Science". GNJ begins by stating in the abstract that "The Future of Citizen Science": "provides an important theoretical perspective about the future of democratized science and K12 education." But GRB state: "However, the authors (MTB) fail to adequately address the existing barriers and constraints to moving community-based science into the classroom." They end the abstract by arguing: "that the resource constraints of scientists, teachers, and students likely pose problems to moving true democratized science into the classroom."

In 2014, a study was published called "Citizen Science and Lifelong Learning" by R. Edwards in the journal Studies in the Education of Adults. Edwards begins by writing in the abstract that citizen science projects have expanded over recent years and engaged citizen scientists and professionals in diverse ways. He continues: "Yet there has been little educational exploration of such projects to date." He describes that "there has been limited exploration of the educational backgrounds of adult contributors to citizen science". Edwards explains that citizen science contributors are referred to as volunteers, citizens or as amateurs. He ends the abstract: "The article will explore the nature and significance of these different characterisations and also suggest possibilities for further research."

In the journal Microbiology and Biology Education a study was published by Shah and Martinez (2015) called "Current Approaches in Implementing Citizen Science in the Classroom". They begin by writing in the abstract that citizen science is a partnership between inexperienced amateurs and trained scientists. The authors continue: "With recent studies showing a weakening in scientific competency of American students, incorporating citizen science initiatives in the curriculum provides a means to address deficiencies". They argue that combining traditional and innovative methods can help provide a practical experience of science. The abstract ends: "Citizen science can be used to emphasize the recognition and use of systematic approaches to solve problems affecting the community."

In November 2017, authors Mitchell, Triska and Liberatore published a study in PLOS ONE titled "Benefits and Challenges of Incorporating Citizen Science into University Education". The authors begin by stating in the abstract that citizen scientists contribute data with the expectation that it will be used. It reports that citizen science has been used for first year university students as a means to experience research. They continue: "Surveys of more than 1500 students showed that their environmental engagement increased significantly after participating in data collection and data analysis." However, only a third of students agreed that data collected by citizen scientists was reliable. A positive outcome of this was that the students were more careful of their own research. The abstract ends: "If true for citizen scientists in general, enabling participants as well as scientists to analyse data could enhance data quality, and so address a key constraint of broad-scale citizen science programs."

Citizen science has also been described as challenging the "traditional hierarchies and structures of knowledge creation".

History 

While citizen science developed at the end of the 20th century, characteristics of citizen science are not new. Prior to the 20th century, science was often the pursuit of gentleman scientists, amateur or self-funded researchers such as Sir Isaac Newton, Benjamin Franklin, and Charles Darwin. Women citizen scientists from before the 20th century include Florence Nightingale who "perhaps better embodies the radical spirit of citizen science". Before the professionalization of science by the end of the 19th century, most pursued scientific projects as an activity rather than a profession itself, an example being amateur naturalists in the 18th and 19th centuries.

During the British colonization of North America, American Colonists recorded the weather, offering much of the information now used to estimate climate data and climate change during this time period. These people included John Campanius Holm, who recorded storms in the mid-1600s, as well as George Washington, Thomas Jefferson, and Benjamin Franklin who tracked weather patterns during America's founding. Their work focused on identifying patterns by amassing their data and that of their peers and predecessors, rather than specific professional knowledge in scientific fields.  Some consider these individuals to be the first citizen scientists, some consider figures such as Leonardo da Vinci and Charles Darwin to be citizen scientists, while others feel that citizen science is a distinct movement that developed later on, building on the preceding history of science.

By the mid-20th century, however, science was dominated by researchers employed by universities and government research laboratories. By the 1970s, this transformation was being called into question. Philosopher Paul Feyerabend called for a "democratization of science". Biochemist Erwin Chargaff advocated a return to science by nature-loving amateurs in the tradition of Descartes, Newton, Leibniz, Buffon, and Darwin—science dominated by "amateurship instead of money-biased technical bureaucrats".

A study from 2016 indicates that the largest impact of citizen science is in research on biology, conservation and ecology, and is utilized mainly as a methodology of collecting and classifying data.

Amateur astronomy

Astronomy has long been a field where amateurs have contributed throughout time, all the way up to the present day.

Collectively, amateur astronomers observe a variety of celestial objects and phenomena sometimes with equipment that they build themselves. Common targets of amateur astronomers include the Moon, planets, stars, comets, meteor showers, and a variety of deep-sky objects such as star clusters, galaxies, and nebulae. Observations of comets and stars are also used to measure the local level of artificial skyglow. One branch of amateur astronomy, amateur astrophotography, involves the taking of photos of the night sky. Many amateurs like to specialize in the observation of particular objects, types of objects, or types of events that interest them.

The American Association of Variable Star Observers has gathered data on variable stars for educational and professional analysis since 1911 and promotes participation beyond its membership on its Citizen Sky website.

Project PoSSUM is a relatively new organization, started in March 2012, which trains citizen scientists of many ages to go on polar suborbital missions. On these missions, they study noctilucent clouds with remote sensing, which reveals interesting clues about changes in the upper atmosphere and the ozone due to climate change. This is a form of citizen science which trains younger generations to be ambitious, participating in intriguing astronomy and climate change science projects even without a professional degree.

Butterfly counts

Butterfly counts have a long tradition of involving individuals in the study of butterflies' range and their relative abundance. Two long-running programs are the UK Butterfly Monitoring Scheme (started in 1976) and the North American Butterfly Association's Butterfly Count Program (started in 1975). There are various protocols for monitoring butterflies and different organizations support one or more of transects, counts and/or opportunistic sightings. eButterfly is an example of a program designed to capture any of the three types of counts for observers in North America. Species-specific programs also exist, with monarchs the prominent example. Two examples of this involve the counting of monarch butterflies during the fall migration to overwintering sites in Mexico: (1) Monarch Watch is a continent-wide project, while (2) the Cape May Monarch Monitoring Project is an example of a local project. The Austrian project Viel-Falter investigated if and how trained and supervised pupils are able to systematically collect data about the occurrence of diurnal butterflies, and how this data could contribute to a permanent butterfly monitoring system. Despite substantial identification uncertainties for some species or species groups, the data collected by pupils was successfully used to predict the general habitat quality for butterflies.

Ornithology

Citizen science projects have become increasingly focused on providing benefits to scientific research. The North American Bird Phenology Program (historically called the Bird Migration and Distribution records) may have been the earliest collective effort of citizens collecting ornithological information in the U.S. The program, dating back to 1883, was started by Wells Woodbridge Cooke. Cooke established a network of observers around North America to collect bird migration records. The Audubon Society's Christmas Bird Count, which began in 1900, is another example of a long-standing tradition of citizen science which has persisted to the present day, now containing a collection of six million handwritten migration observer cards that date back to the 19th century. Participants input this data into an online database for analysis. Citizen scientists help gather data that will be analyzed by professional researchers, and can be used to produce bird population and biodiversity indicators.

Raptor migration research relies on the data collected by the hawkwatching community. This mostly volunteer group counts migrating accipiters, buteos, falcons, harriers, kites, eagles, osprey, vultures and other raptors at hawk sites throughout North America during the spring and fall seasons. The daily data is uploaded to hawkcount.org where it can be viewed by professional scientists and the public.

Such indices can be useful tools to inform management, resource allocation, policy and planning. For example, European breeding bird survey data provide input for the Farmland Bird Index, adopted by the European Union as a structural indicator of sustainable development. This provides a cost-effective alternative to government monitoring.

Similarly, data collected by citizen scientists as part of BirdLife Australia's has been analysed to produce the first-ever Australian Terrestrial Bird Indices.

Most recently, more programs have sprung up worldwide, including NestWatch, a bird species monitoring program which tracks data on reproduction. This might include studies on when and how often nesting occurs, counting eggs laid and how many hatch successfully, and what proportion of hatchlings survive infancy. Participation in this program is extremely easy for the general public to join. Using the recently created nest watch app which is available on almost all devices, anyone can begin to observe their local species, recording results every 3 to 4 days within the app. This forms a continually-growing database which researchers can view and utilize to understand trends within specific bird populations.

Citizen oceanography 
The concept of citizen science has been extended to the ocean environment for characterizing ocean dynamics and tracking marine debris. For example, the mobile app Marine Debris Tracker is a joint partnership of National Oceanic and Atmospheric Administration and the University of Georgia. Long term sampling efforts such as the continuous plankton recorder has been fitted on ships of opportunity since 1931. Plankton collection by sailors and subsequent genetic analysis was pioneered in 2013 by Indigo V Expeditions as a way to better understand marine microbial structure and function.

Coral reefs 
Citizen science in coral reef studies developed in the 21st century.

Underwater photography has become more popular since the development of moderate priced digital cameras with waterproof housings in the early 2000s, resulting on millions of pictures posted every year on various websites and social media. This mass of documentation has great scientific potential, as millions of tourists possess a much superior coverage power than professional scientists, who cannot spend so much time in the field.

As a consequence, several participative sciences programs have been developed, supported by geotagging and identification web sites such as iNaturalist. The Monitoring through many eyes project collates thousands of underwater images of the Great Barrier Reef and provides an interface for elicitation of reef health indicators.

The National Oceanic and Atmospheric Administration (NOAA) also offers opportunities for volunteer participation. By taking measurements in The United States' National Marine Sanctuaries, citizens contribute data to marine biology projects. In 2016, NOAA benefited from 137,000 hours of research.

There also exist protocols for auto-organization and self-teaching aimed at biodiversity-interested snorkelers, in order for them to turn their observations into sound scientific data, available for research. This kind of approach has been successfully used in Réunion island, allowing for tens of new records and even new species.

Freshwater fish 
Aquarium hobbyists and their respective organizations are very passionate about fish conservation and often more knowledgeable about specific fish species and groups than scientific researchers. They have played an important role in the conservation of freshwater fishes by discovering new species, maintaining extensive databases with ecological information on thousands of species (such as for catfish, Mexican freshwater fishes, killifishes, cichlids), and successfully keeping and providing endangered and extinct-in-the-wild species for conservation projects. The CARES (Conservation, Awareness, Recognition, Encouragement, and Support) preservation program is the largest hobbyist organization containing over 30 aquarium societies and international organizations, and encourages serious aquarium hobbyists to devote tank space to the most threatened or extinct-in-the-wild species to ensure their survival for future generations.

Amphibians 
Citizen scientists also work to monitor and conserve amphibian populations. One recent project is FrogWatch USA, organized by the Association of Zoos and Aquariums. Participants are invited to educate themselves on their local wetlands and help to save amphibian populations by reporting the data on the calls of local frogs and toads. The project already has over 150,000 observations from more than 5000 contributors. Participants are trained by program coordinators to identify calls and utilize this training to report data they find between February and August of each "monitoring season". Data is used to monitor diversity, invasion, and long-term shifts in population health within these frog and toad communities.

Rocky reefs 

Reef Life Survey is a marine life monitoring programme based in Hobart, Tasmania. The project uses recreational divers that have been trained to make fish and invertebrate counts, using an approximate 50m constant depth transect of tropical and temperate reefs, which might include coral reefs. Reef Life Survey is international in its scope, but the data collectors are predominantly from Australia. The database is available to marine ecology researchers, and is used by several marine protected area managements in Australia, New Zealand, American Samoa and the eastern Pacific. Its results have also been included in the Australian Ocean DATA Network.

Agriculture 

Farmer participation in experiments has a long tradition in agricultural science. There are many opportunities for citizen engagement in different parts of food systems. Citizen science is actively used for crop variety selection for climate adaptation, involving thousands of farmers.

Art history 
Citizen science has a long tradition in natural science. Today, citizen science projects can also be found in various fields of science like art history. For example, the Zooniverse project AnnoTate is a transcription tool developed to enable volunteers to read and transcribe the personal papers of British-born and émigré artists. The papers are drawn from the Tate Archive. Another example of citizen science in art history is ARTigo. ARTigo collects semantic data on artworks from the footprints left by players of games featuring artwork images. From these footprints, ARTigo automatically builds a semantic search engine for artworks.

Biodiversity

Citizen science has made significant contributions to the analysis of biodiversity across the world. A majority of data collected has been focused primarily on species occurrence, abundance and phenology with birds being primarily the most popular group observed There is growing efforts to expand the use of citizen science across other fields. Past data on biodiversity has had limitations in the quantity of data to make any meaningful broad connections to losses in biodiversity. Recruiting citizens already out in the field opens a tremendous amount of new data. For example, thousands of farmers reporting the changes in biodiversity in their farms over many years has provided a large amount of relevant data concerning the effect of different farming methods on biodiversity. Another example, is WomSAT, a citizen science project that collects data on wombat roadkill and sarcoptic mange incidence and distribution, to support conservation efforts for the species.
Citizen science can be used to great effect in addition to the usual scientific methods in biodiversity monitoring. The typical active method of species detection is able to collect data on the broad biodiversity of areas while citizen science approaches has shown to be more effective at identifying invasive species. In combination, this provides an effective strategy of monitoring the changes in biodiversity of ecosystems.

Health and welfare 
In the research fields of health and welfare, citizen science is often discussed in other terms, such as "public involvement", "user engagement", or "community member involvement". However the meaning is similar to citizen science, with the exception that citizens are not often involved in collecting data but more often involved in prioritisation of research ideas and improving methodology, e.g. survey questions. In the last decades, researchers and funders have gained awareness of the benefits from involving citizens in the research work, but the involvement of citizens in a meaningful way is not a common practice. There is an ongoing discussion on how to evaluate citizen science in health and welfare research.

One aspect to consider in citizen science in health and welfare, that stands out compared to in other academic fields, is who to involve. When research concerns human experiences, representation of a group becomes important. While it is commonly acknowledged that the people involved need to have lived experience of the concerned topic, representation is still an issue, and researchers are debating whether this is a useful concept in citizen science.

Modern technology 
Newer technologies have increased the options for citizen science. Citizen scientists can build and operate their own instruments to gather data for their own experiments or as part of a larger project. Examples include amateur radio, amateur astronomy, Six Sigma Projects, and Maker activities. Scientist Joshua Pearce has advocated for the creation of open-source hardware based scientific equipment that both citizen scientists and professional scientists, which can be replicated by digital manufacturing techniques such as 3D printing. Multiple studies have shown this approach radically reduces scientific equipment costs. Examples of this approach include water testing, nitrate and other environmental testing, basic biology and optics. Groups such as Public Lab, which is a community where citizen scientists can learn how to investigate environmental concerns using inexpensive DIY techniques, embody this approach.

Video technology is much used in scientific research. The Citizen Science Center in the Nature Research Center wing of the North Carolina Museum of Natural Sciences has exhibits on how to get involved in scientific research and become a citizen scientist. For example, visitors can observe birdfeeders at the Prairie Ridge Ecostation satellite facility via live video feed and record which species they see.

Since 2005, the Genographic Project has used the latest genetic technology to expand our knowledge of the human story, and its pioneering use of DNA testing to engage and involve the public in the research effort has helped to create a new breed of "citizen scientist". Geno 2.0 expands the scope for citizen science, harnessing the power of the crowd to discover new details of human population history. This includes supporting, organization and dissemination of personal DNA (genetic) testing. Like amateur astronomy, citizen scientists encouraged by volunteer organizations like the International Society of Genetic Genealogy have provided valuable information and research to the professional scientific community.

With unmanned aerial vehicles, further citizen science is enabled. One example is the ESA's AstroDrone smartphone app for gathering robotic data with the Parrot AR.Drone.

Citizens in Space (CIS), a project of the United States Rocket Academy, seeks to combine citizen science with citizen space exploration. CIS is training citizen astronauts to fly as payload operators on suborbital reusable spacecraft that are now in development. CIS will also be developing, and encouraging others to develop, citizen-science payloads to fly on suborbital vehicles. CIS has already acquired a contract for 10 flights on the Lynx suborbital vehicle, being developed by XCOR Aerospace, and plans to acquire additional flights on XCOR Lynx and other suborbital vehicles in the future.

CIS believes that "The development of low-cost reusable suborbital spacecraft will be the next great enabler, allowing citizens to participate in space exploration and space science."

The website CitizenScience.gov was started by the U.S. government to "accelerate the use of crowdsourcing and citizen science" in the United States. Following the internet's rapid increase of citizen science projects, this site is one of the most prominent resource banks for citizen scientists and government supporters alike. It features three sections: a catalog of existing citizen science projects which are federally supported, a toolkit to help federal officials as they develop and maintain their future projects, and several other resources and projects. This was created as the result of a mandate within the Crowdsourcing and Citizen Science Act of 2016 (15 USC 3724).

Internet

The Internet has been a boon to citizen science, particularly through gamification. One of the first Internet-based citizen science experiments was NASA's Clickworkers, which enabled the general public to assist in the classification of images, greatly reducing the time to analyze large data sets. Another was the Citizen Science Toolbox, launched in 2003, of the Australian Coastal Collaborative Research Centre. Mozak is a game in which players create 3D reconstructions from images of actual human and mouse neurons, helping to advance understanding of the brain. One of the largest citizen science games is Eyewire, a brain-mapping puzzle game developed at the Massachusetts Institute of Technology that now has over 200,000 players. Another example is Quantum Moves, a game developed by the Center for Driven Community Research at Aarhus University, which uses online community efforts to solve quantum physics problems. The solutions found by players can then be used in the lab to feed computational algorithms used in building a scalable quantum computer.

More generally, Amazon's Mechanical Turk is frequently used in the creation, collection, and processing of data by paid citizens. There is controversy as to whether or not the data collected through such services is reliable, as it is subject to participants' desire for compensation. However, use of Mechanical Turk tends to quickly produce more diverse participant backgrounds, as well as comparably accurate data when compared to traditional collection methods.

The internet has also enabled citizen scientists to gather data to be analyzed by professional researchers. Citizen science networks are often involved in the observation of cyclic events of nature (phenology), such as effects of global warming on plant and animal life in different geographic areas, and in monitoring programs for natural-resource management. On BugGuide.Net, an online community of naturalists who share observations of arthropod, amateurs and professional researchers contribute to the analysis. By October 2022, BugGuide has over 1,886,513 images submitted by 47,732 contributors.

Not counting iNaturalist and eBird, the Zooniverse is home to the internet's largest, most popular and most successful citizen science projects. The Zooniverse and the suite of projects it contains is produced, maintained and developed by the Citizen Science Alliance (CSA). The member institutions of the CSA work with many academic and other partners around the world to produce projects that use the efforts and ability of volunteers to help scientists and researchers deal with the flood of data that confronts them. On 29 June 2015, the Zooniverse released a new software version with a project-building tool allowing any registered user to create a project. Project owners may optionally complete an approval process to have their projects listed on the Zooniverse site and promoted to the Zooniverse community. A NASA/JPL picture to the right gives an example from one of Zooniverse's projects The Milky Way Project.

The website CosmoQuest has as its goal "To create a community of people bent on together advancing our understanding of the universe; a community of people who are participating in doing science, who can explain why what they do matters, and what questions they are helping to answer."

CrowdCrafting enables its participants to create and run projects where volunteers help with image classification, transcription, geocoding and more. The platform is powered by PyBossa software, a free and open-source framework for crowdsourcing.

Project Soothe is a citizen science research project based at the University of Edinburgh. The aim of this research is to create a bank of soothing images, submitted by members of the public, which can be used to help others through psychotherapy and research in the future. Since 2015, Project Soothe has received over 600 soothing photographs from people in 23 countries. Anyone aged 12 years or over is eligible to participate in this research in two ways: (1) By submitting soothing photos that they have taken with a description of why the images make them feel soothed (2) By rating the photos that have been submitted by people worldwide for their soothability.

The internet has allowed for many individuals to share and upload massive amounts of data. Using the internet citizen observatories have been designed as a platform to both increase citizen participation and knowledge of their surrounding environment by collecting whatever relevant data is focused by the program. The idea is making it easier and more exciting for citizens to get and stay involved in local data collection.

The invention of social media has aided in providing massive amounts of information from the public to create citizen science programs. In a case study by Andrea Liberatore, Erin Bowkett, Catriona J. MacLeod, Eric Spurr, and Nancy Longnecker, the New Zealand Garden Bird Survey is conducted as one such project with the aid of social media. It examines the influence of utilizing a Facebook group to collect data from citizen scientists as the researchers work on the project over the span of a year. The authors claim that this use of social media greatly helps with the efficiency of this study and makes the atmosphere feel more communal.

Smartphone 

The bandwidth and ubiquity afforded by smartphones has vastly expanded the opportunities for citizen science. Examples include iNaturalist, the San Francisco project, the WildLab, Project Noah, and Aurorasurus. Due to their ubiquity, for example, Twitter, Facebook, and smartphones have been useful for citizen scientists, having enabled them to discover and propagate a new type of aurora dubbed "STEVE" in 2016.

There are also apps for monitoring birds, marine wildlife and other organisms, and the "Loss of the Night".

An Android app Sapelli is a mobile data-collection and -sharing platform designed with a particular focus on non-literate and illiterate users. The SPOTTERON app creates synergy effects for projects by sharing a common feature set.

"The Crowd and the Cloud" is a four-part series broadcast during April 2017, which examines citizen science. It shows how smartphones, computers and mobile technology enable regular citizens to become part of a 21st-century way of doing science. The programs also demonstrate how citizen scientists help professional scientists to advance knowledge, which helps speed up new discoveries and innovations. The Crowd & The Cloud is based upon work supported by the National Science Foundation.

Seismology

Since 1975, in order to improve earthquake detection and collect useful information, the European-Mediterranean Seismological Centre monitors the visits of earthquake eyewitnesses to its website and relies on Facebook and Twitter. More recently, they developed the LastQuake mobile application which notifies users about earthquakes occurring around the world, alerts people when earthquakes hit near them, gathers earthquake eyewitnesses' testimonies to estimate the felt ground shaking and possible damages.

Hydrology
Citizen science has been used to provide valuable data in hydrology (catchment science), notably flood risk, water quality, and water resource management. A growth in internet use and smartphone ownership has allowed users to collect and share real-time flood-risk information using, for example, social media and web-based forms. Although traditional data collection methods are well-established, citizen science is being used to fill the data gaps on a local level, and is therefore meaningful to individual communities. Data collected from citizen science can also compare well to professionally-collected data. It has been demonstrated that citizen science is particularly advantageous during a flash flood because the public are more likely to witness these rarer hydrological events than scientists.

Plastics and pollution

Citizen science includes projects that help monitor plastics and their associated pollution. These include The Ocean Cleanup, #OneLess, The Big Microplastic Survey, EXXpedition and Alliance to End Plastic Waste. Ellipsis seeks to map the distribution of litter using aerial data mapping by unmanned aerial vehicles and machine learning software. A Zooniverse project called The Plastic Tide (now finished) helped train an algorithm used by Ellipsis.

Examples of relevant articles (by date):
 Citizen Science Promotes Environmental Engagement: (quote) "Citizen science projects are rapidly gaining popularity among the public, in which volunteers help gather data on species that can be used by scientists in research. And it's not just adults who are involved in these projects – even kids have collected high-quality data in the US."
 Tackling Microplastics on Our Own: (quote) "Plastics, ranging from the circles of soda can rings to microbeads the size of pinheads, are starting to replace images of sewage for a leading cause of pollution – especially in the ocean". Further, "With recent backing from the Crowdsourcing and Citizen Science Act, citizen science is increasingly embraced as a tool by US Federal agencies."
 Citizen Scientists Are Tracking Plastic Pollution Worldwide: (quote) "Scientists who are monitoring the spread of tiny pieces of plastic throughout the environment are getting help from a small army of citizen volunteers – and they're finding bits of polymer in some of the most remote parts of North America."
 Artificial intelligence and citizen scientists: Powering the clean-up of Asia Pacific's beaches:(quote) "The main objective is to support citizen scientists cleaning up New Zealand beaches and get a better understanding of why litter is turning up, so preventive and proactive action can be taken."
 Citizen science could help address Canada's plastic pollution problem: (quote) "But citizen engagement and participation in science goes beyond beach cleanups, and can be used as a tool to bridge gaps between communities and scientists. These partnerships between scientists and citizen scientists have produced real world data that have influenced policy changes."

Examples of relevant scientific studies or books include (by date):
 Distribution and abundance of small plastic debris on beaches in the SE Pacific (Chile): a study supported by a citizen science project: (quote) "The citizen science project "National Sampling of Small Plastic Debris" was supported by schoolchildren from all over Chile who documented the distribution and abundance of small plastic debris on Chilean beaches. Thirty-nine schools and nearly 1000 students from continental Chile and Easter Island participated in the activity."
 Incorporating citizen science to study plastics in the environment: (quote) "Taking advantage of public interest in the impact of plastic on the marine environment, successful Citizen Science (CS) programs incorporate members of the public to provide repeated sampling for time series as well as synoptic collections over wide geographic regions."
 Marine anthropogenic litter on British beaches: A 10-year nationwide assessment using citizen science data: (quote) "Citizen science projects, whereby members of the public gather information, offer a low-cost method of collecting large volumes of data with considerable temporal and spatial coverage. Furthermore, such projects raise awareness of environmental issues and can lead to positive changes in behaviours and attitudes."
 Determining Global Distribution of Microplastics by Combining Citizen Science and In-Depth Case Studies: (quote) "Our first project involves the general public through citizen science. Participants collect sand samples from beaches using a basic protocol, and we subsequently extract and quantify microplastics in a central laboratory using the standard operating procedure."
 Risk Perception of Plastic Pollution: Importance of Stakeholder Involvement and Citizen Science: (quote) "The chapter finally discusses how risk perception can be improved by greater stakeholder involvement and utilization of citizen science and thereby improve the foundation for timely and efficient societal measures."
 Assessing the citizen science approach as tool to increase awareness on the marine litter problem: (quote) "This paper provides a quantitative assessment of students' attitude and behaviors towards marine litter before and after their participation to SEACleaner, an educational and citizen science project devoted to monitor macro- and micro-litter in an Area belonging to Pelagos Sanctuary."
 Spatial trends and drivers of marine debris accumulation on shorelines in South Eleuthera, The Bahamas using citizen science: (quote) "This study measured spatial distribution of marine debris stranded on beaches in South Eleuthera, The Bahamas. Citizen science, fetch modeling, relative exposure index and predictive mapping were used to determine marine debris source and abundance."
 Making citizen science count: Best practices and challenges of citizen science projects on plastics in aquatic environments: (quote) "Citizen science is a cost-effective way to gather data over a large geographical range while simultaneously raising public awareness on the problem".
 White and wonderful? Microplastics prevail in snow from the Alps to the Arctic: (quote) "In March 2018, five samples were taken at different locations on Svalbard (Fig. 1A and Table 1) by citizen scientists embarking on a land expedition by ski-doo (Aemalire project). The citizens were instructed on contamination prevention and equipped with protocol forms, prerinsed 2-liter stainless steel containers (Ecotanca), a porcelain mug, a steel spoon, and a soup ladle for sampling."

Citizen sensing

Citizen sensing can be a form of citizen science: (quote) "The work of citizen sensing, as a form of citizen science, then further transforms Stengers's notion of the work of science by moving the experimental facts and collectives where scientific work is undertaken out of the laboratory of experts and into the world of citizens." Similar sensing activities include Crowdsensing and participatory monitoring. While the idea of using mobile technology to aid this sensing is not new, creating devices and systems that can be used to aid regulation has not been straightforward. Some examples of projects that include citizen sensing are:
 Citizen Sense (2013-2018): (quote) "Practices of monitoring and sensing environments have migrated to everyday participatory applications, where users of smart phones and networked devices are able to engage with modes of environmental observation and data collection."
 Breathe Project: (quote) "We use the best available science and technology to better understand the quality of the air we breathe and provide opportunities for citizens to engage and take action."
 The Bristol Approach to Citizen Sensing: (quote) "Citizen Sensing is about empowering people and places to understand and use smart tech and data from sensors to tackle the issues they care about, connect with other people who can help, and take positive, practical action."
 Luftdaten.info: (quote) "You and thousands of others around the world install self-built sensors on the outside their home. Luftdaten.info generates a continuously updated particular matter map from the transmitted data."
 CitiSense: (quote) "CitiSense aims to co-develop a participatory risk management system (PRMS) with citizens, local authorities and organizations which enables them to contribute to advanced climate services and enhanced urban climate resilience as well as receive recommendations that support their security."

A group of citizen scientists in a community-led project targeting toxic smoke from wood burners in Bristol, has recorded 11 breaches of World Health Organization daily guidelines for ultra-fine particulate pollution over a period of six months.

In a £7m programme funded by water regulator Ofwat, citizen scientists are being trained to test for pollution and over-abstraction in 10 river catchment areas in the UK. Sensors will be used and the information gathered will be available in a central visualisation platform. The project is led by The Rivers Trust and United Utilities and includes volunteers such as anglers testing the rivers they use. The Angling Trust provides the pollution sensors, with Kristian Kent from the Trust saying: "Citizen science is a reality of the world in the future, so they’re not going to be able to just sweep it under the carpet."

COVID-19 pandemic 

Resources for computer science and scientific crowdsourcing projects concerning COVID-19 can be found on the internet or as apps. Some such projects are listed below:
 The distributed computing project Folding@home launched a program to assist researchers around the world who are working on finding a cure and learning more about the coronavirus pandemic. The initial wave of projects are meant to simulate potentially druggable protein targets from SARS-CoV-2, and the related SARS-CoV virus, about which there is significantly more data available.
 Distributed computing project Rosetta@home also joined the effort in March. The project uses computers of volunteers to model SARS-CoV-2 virus proteins to discover possible drug targets or create new proteins to neutralize the virus. Researchers revealed that with the help of Rosetta@home, they had been able to "accurately predict the atomic-scale structure of an important coronavirus protein weeks before it could be measured in the lab."
 The OpenPandemics - COVID-19 project is a partnership between Scripps Research and IBM's World Community Grid for a distributed computing project that "will automatically run a simulated experiment in the background [of connected home PCs] which will help predict the effectiveness of a particular chemical compound as a possible treatment for COVID-19".
 The Eterna OpenVaccine project enables video game players to "design an mRNA encoding a potential vaccine against the novel coronavirus."
 The EU-Citizen.Science project has "a selection of resources related to the current COVID19 pandemic. It contains links to citizen science and crowdsourcing projects"
 The COVID-19 Citizen Science project is "a new initiative by University of California, San Francisco physician-scientists" that "will allow anyone in the world age 18 or over to become a citizen scientist advancing understanding of the disease."
 The CoronaReport digital journalism project is "a citizen science project which democratizes the reporting on the Coronavirus, and makes these reports accessible to other citizens."
 The COVID Symptom Tracker is a crowdsourced study of the symptoms of the virus. It has had two million downloads by April 2020.
 The Covid Near You epidemiology tool "uses crowdsourced data to visualize maps to help citizens and public health agencies identify current and potential hotspots for the recent pandemic coronavirus, COVID-19."
 The We-Care project is a novel initiative by University of California, Davis researchers that uses anonymity and crowdsourced information to alert infected users and slow the spread of COVID-19.
 COVID RADAR was an app in the Netherlands, active between April 2020 and February 2022, with which users anonymously answered a short daily questionnaire asking about their symptoms, behavior, coronavirus test results, and vaccination status. Symptoms and behavior were visualized on a map and users received feedback on their individual risk and behaviors relative to the national mean. The app had over 250,000 users, who filled out the questionnaire over 8.5 million times.

For coronavirus studies and information that can help enable citizen science, many online resources are available through open access and open science websites, including portals run by the Cambridge University Press, the Europe branch of the Scholarly Publishing and Academic Resources Coalition, The Lancet, John Wiley and Sons, and Springer Nature.

Around the world

Africa

 In South Africa (SA), citizen science projects include: the Stream Assessment Scoring System (miniSASS) which "encourages enhanced catchment management for water security in a climate stressed society."
 The South African National Biodiversity Institute is partnered with iNaturalist as a platform for biodiversity observations using digital photography and geolocation technology to monitor biodiversity. Such partnerships can reduce duplication of effort, help standardise procedures and make the data more accessible.
 Also in SA, "Members of the public, or 'citizen scientists' are helping researchers from the University of Pretoria to identify Phytophthora species present in the fynbos."
 In June 2016, citizen science experts from across East Africa gathered in Nairobi, Kenya, for a symposium organised by the Tropical Biology Association (TBA) in partnership with the Centre for Ecology & Hydrology (CEH). The aim was "to harness the growing interest and expertise in East Africa to stimulate new ideas and collaborations in citizen science." Rosie Trevelyan of the TBA said: "We need to enhance our knowledge about the status of Africa's species and the threats facing them. And scientists can't do it all on their own. At the same time, citizen science is an extremely effective way of connecting people more closely to nature and enrolling more people in conservation action".
 The website Zooniverse hosts several African citizen science projects, including: Snapshot Serengeti, Wildcam Gorongosa and Jungle Rhythms.
 Nigeria has the Ibadan Bird Club whose to aim is to "exchange ideas and share knowledge about birds, and get actively involved in the conservation of birds and biodiversity."
 In Namibia, Giraffe Spotter.org is "project that will provide people with an online citizen science platform for giraffes".
 Within the Republic of the Congo, the territories of an indigenous people have been mapped so that "the Mbendjele tribe can protect treasured trees from being cut down by logging companies". An Android open-source app called Sapelli was used by the Mbendjele which helped them map "their tribal lands and highlighted trees that were important to them, usually for medicinal reasons or religious significance. Congolaise Industrielle des Bois then verified the trees that the tribe documented as valuable and removed them from its cutting schedule. The tribe also documented illegal logging and poaching activities."
 In West Africa, the eradication of the recent outbreak of Ebola virus disease was partly helped by citizen science. "Communities learnt how to assess the risks posed by the disease independently of prior cultural assumptions, and local empiricism allowed cultural rules to be reviewed, suspended or changed as epidemiological facts emerged." "Citizen science is alive and well in all three Ebola-affected countries. And if only a fraction of the international aid directed at rebuilding health systems were to be redirected towards support for citizen science, that might be a fitting memorial to those who died in the epidemic."

Asia
 The Hong Kong Birdwatching Society was established in 1957, and is the only local civil society aiming at appreciating and conserving Hong Kong birds and their natural environment. Their bird surveys go back to 1958, and they carry out a number of Citizen Science events such as their yearly sparrow census.

 The Bird Count India partnership consists of a large number of organizations and groups involved in birdwatching and bird surveys. They coordinate a number of Citizen Science projects such as the Kerala Bird Atlas and Mysore city Bird Atlas that map the distribution and abundance of birds of entire Indian states.
 RAD@home Astronomy Collaboratory is an Indian citizen science research platform in astronomy. The collaboratory primarily focuses on making discoveries from the new and sensitive TIFR GMRT Sky Survey (TGSS) data and follow them up with the Giant Metrewave Radio Telescope, a SKA pathfinder, through the ongoing GMRT Time Allocation Committee-approved multi-cycle project GMRT Observation of Objects Discovered by RAD@home Astronomy Collaboratory (GOOD-RAC).
 The Taiwan Roadkill Observation Network, founded in 2011 and consists of more than 16,000 members as of 2019, is a Citizen Science project where roadkill across Taiwan is photographed and sent to the Endemic Species Research Institute for study. Its primary goal has been to set up an eco-friendly path to mitigate roadkill challenges and popularize national discourse on environmental issues and civil participation in scientific research. The members of the Taiwan Roadkill Observation Network volunteer to observe the animals' corpses caused by roadkill or other reasons in Taiwan, and upload pictures and geographic locations of the roadkill to an internet database or send the corpses to the Endemic Species Research for making specimen. Because the members come from different areas of the island, the collection of data could serve as an animal distribution map of the island. According to the geographical data and pictures of dead animals collected by the members, the community itself and the sponsor the Endemic Species Center could find out the hotspots and the reasons of animals' death. One of the most renowned case is that the community successfully detected rabies cases due to the massively collected data and the corpse of Melogale moschata have been accumulated for years and alarmed the government authority to take actions to prevent the prevalence of rabies in Taiwan immediately. Another case in 2014 that some citizen scientists discovered birds that died from unknown causes near an agricultural area, then Taiwan Roadkill Observation Network cooperated with National Pingtung University of Science and Technology and engaged citizen scientists to collect bird carcass. The volunteers collected 250 bird corpses for laboratory tests, which confirmed that the bird deaths were attributable to the pesticides used on crops. This prompted the Taiwanese government to restrict pesticides, and the Bill of Pesticide Management amendment, establishing a pesticide control system, was passed after the third reading in the Legislative Yuan. The results indicated that Taiwan Roadkill Observation Network developed a set of shared working methods and jointly completed certain actions. Furthermore, the community of Taiwan Roadkill Observation Network have made real changes on road resign to avoid roadkill, improved the management of usage of pesticide, epidemic prevention, and so on.
 The AirBox Project was launched in Taiwan to create a participatory ecosystem with a focus on PM2.5 monitoring with AirBox devices. At the end of 2014, the public paid more attention to the PM2.5 level because the air pollution problem became worse, especially in central and southern Taiwan. High PM2.5 level is harmful to our health, such as respiratory problems, so it aroused public concerns and led to an intensive debate about air pollution sources. Some experts indicated that the air quality was affected by pollutants from Mainland China, while some environmentalists believed that it is the result of industrialization such as exhaust fumes from local power plants or factories; however, no one knew the answer because of insufficient data. Dr. Ling-Jyh Chen, a researcher of the Institute of Information Science, Academia Sinica, launched The AirBox Project. His original idea is inspired by a popular Taiwanese slogan Save Your Environment by Yourself. As an expert in Participatory Sensing System, he decided to take this bottom-up approach to collect PM2.5 level data, and through open data and data analysis to have a better understanding of the possible air pollution source. In this ecosystem, massive data was collected from the AirBox device. Data was instantly revealed online to inform people of PM2.5 level so that they take proper action, such as wearing a mask or staying at home, to prevent themselves from directly exploring to polluted environment. Data could be also analyzed to understand the possible sources of pollution and provide recommendations for improving the situation. To be precise, there are four main steps in this project. I) Develop the AirBox device. Developing a device that could correctly collect the data of the PM2.5 level was time-consuming. It took more than three years to develop AirBox that can be easily used, but with both high accuracy and low cost. II) Broad installation of AirBox. In the beginning, very few people were willing to install it at their homes because of their concerns about the possible harm to their health, power-consuming problem and maintenances of it, so that AirBoxs were only installed in a relatively small area. Thanks to the help from Taiwan's LASS (Location Aware Sensing System) community, AirBox appeared in all parts of Taiwan. As of February 2017, there are more than 1,600 Air Boxes installed in more than 27 countries. III) Open Source and Data Analysis. All measurement results were released and visualized in real-time to the public through different media. Data can be analyzed to trace pollution sources.
 Japan has a long history of citizen science involvement, the 1,200-year-old tradition of collecting records on cherry blossom flowering probably being the world's longest-running citizen science project. One of the most influential citizen science projects has also come out of Japan: Safecast. Dedicated to open citizen science for the environment, Safecast was established in the wake of the Fukushima nuclear disaster, and produces open hardware sensors for radiation and air-pollution mapping. Presenting this data via a global open data network and maps

Europe

The English naturalist Charles Darwin (1809–1882) is widely regarded to have been one of the earliest citizen science contributors in Europe (see History). A century later, citizen science was experienced by adolescents in Italy during the 1980s, working on urban energy usages and air pollution.

In his book "Citizen Science", Alan Irwin considers the role that scientific expertise can play in bringing the public and science together and building a more scientifically active citizenry, empowering individuals to contribute to scientific development. Since then a citizen science green paper was published in 2013, and European Commission policy directives have included citizen science as one of five strategic areas with funding allocated to support initiatives through the 'Science With and For Society (SwafS)', a strand of the Horizon 2020 programme. This includes significant awards such as the EU Citizen Science Project, which is creating a hub for knowledge sharing, coordination, and action. The European Citizen Science Association (ECSA) was set up in 2014 to encourage the growth of citizen science across Europe, to increase public participation in scientific processes, mainly by initiating and supporting citizen science projects as well as conducting research. ECSA has a membership of over 250 individual and organisational members from over 30 countries across the European Union and beyond.

Examples of citizen science organisations and associations based in Europe include the Biosphere Expeditions (Ireland), Bürger schaffen Wissen (Germany), Citizen Science Lab at Leiden University (Netherlands), Ibercivis (See External Links), Österreich forscht (Austria). Other organisations can be found here: EU Citizen Science.

Latin America

 In 2015 the Asháninka people from Apiwtxa, which crosses the border between Brazil and Peru, began using the Android app Sapelli to monitor their land. The Ashaninka have "faced historical pressures of disease, exploitation and displacement, and today still face the illegal invasion of their lands by loggers and hunters. This monitoring project shows how the Apiwtxa Ashaninka from the Kampa do Rio Amônia Indigenous Territory, Brazil, are beginning to use smartphones and technological tools to monitor these illegal activities more effectively."
 In Argentina, two smartphone Android applications are available for citizen science. i) AppEAR has been developed at the Institute of Limnology and was launched in May 2016. Joaquín Cochero is a researcher who developed an "application that appeals to the collaboration of users of mobile devices in collecting data that allow the study of aquatic ecosystems" (translation). Cochero stated: "Not much of citizen science in Argentina, just a few more oriented to astronomy specific cases. As ours is the first. And I have volunteers from different parts of the country that are interested in joining together to centralize data. That's great because these types of things require many people participate actively and voluntarily" (translation). ii) eBird was launched in 2013, and has so far identified 965 species of birds. eBird in Argentina is "developed and managed by the Cornell Lab of Ornithology at Cornell University, one of the most important ornithological institutions in the world, and locally presented recently with the support of the Ministry of Science, Technology and Productive Innovation of the Nation (MINCyT)" (translation).
 Projects in Brazil include: i) Platform and mobile app 'Missions' has been developed by IBM in their São Paulo research lab with Brazil's Ministry for Environment and Innovation (BMEI). Sergio Borger, an IBM team lead in São Paulo, devised the crowdsourced approach when BMEI approached the company in 2010. They were looking for a way to create a central repository for the rainforest data. Users can upload photos of a plant species and its components, enter its characteristics (such as color and size), compare it against a catalog photo and classify it. The classification results are juried by crowdsourced ratings. ii) Exoss Citizen Science is a member of Astronomers Without Borders and seeks to explore the southern sky for new meteors and radiants. Users can report meteor fireballs through uploading pictures on to a webpage or by linking to YouTube.  iii) The Information System on Brazilian Biodiversity (SiBBr) was launched in 2014 "aiming to encourage and facilitate the publication, integration, access and use of information about the biodiversity of the country." Their initial goal "was to gather 2.5 million occurrence records of species from biological collections in Brazil and abroad up to the end of 2016. It is now expected that SiBBr will reach nine million records in 2016." Andrea Portela said: "In 2016, we will begin with the citizen science. They are tools that enable anyone, without any technical knowledge, to participate. With this we will achieve greater engagement with society. People will be able to have more interaction with the platform, contribute and comment on what Brazil has." iv) The Brazilian Marine Megafauna Project (Iniciativa Pro Mar) is working with the European CSA towards its main goal, which is the "sensibilization of society for marine life issues" and concerns about pollution and the over-exploitation of natural resources. Having started as a project monitoring manta ray, it now extends to whale shark and educating schools and divers within the Santos area. Its social media activities include a live streaming of a citizen science course to help divers identify marine megafauna. v) A smartphone app called Plantix has been developed by the Leibniz Centre for Agricultural Landscape Research (ZALF) which helps Brazilian farmers discover crop diseases quicker and helps fight them more efficiently. Brazil is a very large agricultural exporter, but between 10 and 30% of crops fail because of disease. "The database currently includes 175 frequently occurring crop diseases and pests as well as 40,000 photos. The identification algorithm of the app improves with every image which records a success rate of over 90 per cent as of approximately 500 photos per crop disease." vi) In an Atlantic Ocean forest region in Brazil, an effort to map the genetic riches of soil is under way. The Drugs From Dirt initiative, based at the Rockefeller University, seeks to turn up bacteria that yield new types of antibiotics – the Brazilian region being particularly rich in potentially useful bacterial genes. Approximately a quarter of the 185 soil samples have been taken by Citizen Scientists without which the project could not run.
 In Chile citizen science projects include (some websites in Spanish): i) Testing new cancer therapies with scientists from the Science Foundation for Life. ii) Monitoring the population of the Chilean bumblebee. iii) Monitoring the invasive ladybird Chinita arlequín. iv) Collecting rain water data. v) Monitoring various pollinating fly populations. vi) Providing information and field data on the abundance and distribution of various species of rockfish. vii) Investigating the environmental pollution by plastic litter.

 Projects in Colombia include (some websites in Spanish): i) The Communications Project of the Humboldt Institute along with the Organization for Education and Environmental Protection initiated projects in the Bogotá wetlands of Cordoba and El Burro, which have a lot of biodiversity. ii) In the Model Forest of Risaralda, the Colombia  promotes citizen participation in research related to how the local environment is adapting to climate change. The first meeting took place in the Flora and Fauna Sanctuary Otún Quimbaya. iii) The Citizen Network Environmental Monitoring (CLUSTER), based in the city of Bucaramanga, seeks to engage younger students in data science, who are trained in building weather stations with open repositories based on free software and open hardware data. iv) The Symposium on Biodiversity has adapted the CS tool iNaturalist for use in Colombia. v) The Sinchi Amazonic Institute of Scientific Research seeks to encourage the development and diffusion of knowledge, values and technologies on the management of natural resources for ethnic groups in the Amazon. This research should further the use of participatory action research schemes and promoting participation communities.
 Since 2010, the Pacific Biodiversity Institute (PBI) seeks "volunteers to help identify, describe and protect wildland complexes and roadless areas in South America". The PBI "are engaged in an ambitious project with our Latin American conservation partners to map all the wildlands in South America, to evaluate their contribution to global biodiversity and to share and disseminate this information."
 In Mexico, a citizen science project has monitored rainfall data that is linked to a hydrologic payment for ecosystem services project.

Conferences

The first Conference on Public Participation in Scientific Research was held in Portland, Oregon, in August 2012. Citizen science is now often a theme at large conferences, such as the annual meeting of the American Geophysical Union.

In 2010, 2012 and 2014 there were three Citizen Cyberscience summits, organised by the Citizen Cyberscience Centre in Geneva and University College London. The 2014 summit was hosted in London and attracted over 300 participants.

In November 2015, the ETH Zürich and University of Zürich hosted an international meeting on the "Challenges and Opportunities in Citizen Science".

The first citizen science conference hosted by the Citizen Science Association was in San Jose, California, in February 2015 in partnership with the AAAS conference. The Citizen Science Association conference, CitSci 2017, was held in Saint Paul, Minnesota, United States, between 17 and 20 May 2017. The conference had more than 600 attendees. The next CitSci is in March 2019 in Raleigh, North Carolina.

The platform "Österreich forscht" hosts the annual Austrian citizen science conference since 2015.

National and regional portals

See also 

 
 
 List of citizen science projects
 List of crowdsourcing projects
 List of volunteer computing projects
 
 
 
  (produced by artists that are non-institutionalized, in the same way as citizen scientists)

References

Further reading 
  "The Mozzie Monitors program marks the first time formal mosquito trapping has been combined with citizen science." (Australian project)
 
 Dick Kasperowsik (interviewed by Ulrich Herb): Citizen Science as democratization of science? In: telepolis, 2016, 27 August
 Ridley, Matt. (8 February 2012) "Following the Crowd to Citizen Science". The Wall Street Journal
 Young, Jeffrey R. (28 May 2010). "Crowd Science Reaches New Heights", The Chronicle of Higher Education

External links 

 
Crowdsourcing
Human-based computation
Open science